Alonso de Escobar (1545–1613) was a Spanish Military, he served as Regidor of Buenos Aires during the Viceroyalty of Peru.

Biography 

Alonso was born in Asuncion, son of Alonso de Escobar y Cáceres (conquistador). He was married in Asuncion with Inés Suares de Toledo, daughter of Martín Suárez de Toledo (governor of Paraguay).
 
Alonso de Escobar was one of 63 neighbors who accompanied Juan de Garay in the second Foundation of Buenos Aires.

References

External links 
www.angelfire.com

1545 births
1613 deaths
16th-century explorers
Explorers of Argentina
Paraguayan people of Spanish descent
People from Asunción
Spanish colonial governors and administrators